Griboyedov may refer to:

 Alexander Griboyedov (1795-1829), Russian playwright and diplomat
 Griboyedov Canal, a canal in the Russian city of Saint Petersburg
 Griboyedov, Armenia, a town in the  Armavir Province of Armenia
 Griboyedov Prize, a Russian literary award

See also
 Valerian Gribayedoff (1858–1908), Russian artist and journalist